William Bensinger (January 14, 1840, to December 19, 1918) was an American soldier who fought for the Union in the American Civil War. On March 25, 1863, he was the second person given the country's highest award for bravery during combat, the Medal of Honor, for his actions during the Great Locomotive Chase in Georgia in April 1862.

Biography

Bensinger was born on January 14, 1840, in  Waynesburg, Ohio, and enlisted into the 21st Ohio Infantry at Hancock County, Ohio. He was among a group of Ohio men (19 soldiers and 2 civilians) who volunteered for a secret mission to disrupt Confederate communication. In April, this group led by James J. Andrews, which later came to be called Andrews' Raiders, boarded a train in Georgia. On April 12, after it stopped in Big Shanty, they commandeered its engine and three boxcars and headed toward Chattanooga, Tennessee. Pursued by the Confederates, they destroyed track and telegraph lines along the way. They never made it to Chattanooga and abandoned the engine, before all were captured within a week. Some were hanged and some, including Bensinger, were taken to prison camp. He eventually escaped and arrived in Washington, D.C., later moving to McComb, Ohio, where he died on December 19, 1918.

Medal of Honor citation

See also

Great Locomotive Chase
List of Andrews Raiders
List of American Civil War Medal of Honor recipients: A–F

References

1840 births
1918 deaths
People of Ohio in the American Civil War
Union Army soldiers
United States Army Medal of Honor recipients
American Civil War recipients of the Medal of Honor
People from Waynesburg, Ohio
People from Hancock County, Ohio
Great Locomotive Chase
Burials in Ohio